Venterspos is a town in West Rand District Municipality in the Gauteng province of South Africa. It was proclaimed in 1937.

References

Populated places in the Rand West City Local Municipality